Shirur Lok Sabha constituency is one of the 48 Lok Sabha (lower house of Indian parliament) constituencies of Maharashtra state in western India. This constituency was created on 19 February 2008 as a part of the implementation of the Presidential notification based on the recommendations of the Delimitation Commission of India constituted on 12 July 2002. This constituency is one of the two newly formed Lok Sabha constituencies in Pune district after delimitation. It first held elections in 2009 and its first member of parliament (MP) was Shivajirao Adhalarao Patil of Shiv Sena. As of the 2019 elections, its MP is Dr. Amol Kolhe who is serving in his first term from this constituency.

Vidhan Sabha segments
Presently, Shirur Lok Sabha constituency comprises six Vidhan Sabha (legislative assembly) segments. These segments are:

Members of Lok Sabha

Election results

General elections 2019

General election 2014

General election 2009

See also
 Khed Lok Sabha constituency
 Pune district
 List of Constituencies of the Lok Sabha

Notes

External links
Shirur lok sabha  constituency election 2019 results details

Lok Sabha constituencies in Maharashtra
Lok Sabha constituencies in Maharashtra created in 2008
Politics of Pune district